Kim Sung-joo (born October 10, 1972) is a South Korean television host and a former announcer. A former sports broadcaster and presenter, he became known to the wider public as a variety show host and for his stint on the reality-variety show Dad! Where Are We Going?.

Early life
Born and raised in North Chungcheong Province, Kim is the son of a Presbyterian minister. He attended high school in Cheongju and moved to Seoul, where he graduated from Chung-Ang University.

Career
Kim started his broadcasting career in 1995 as a public service announcement reader with the government channel KTV. He went into sports broadcasting, joining Korea TV Sports (now SBS Sports) and then Munhwa Broadcasting Corporation (MBC). While with MBC he became popular as a current affairs presenter and notably covered the 2002 and 2006 FIFA World Cups. In 2007 he left MBC to be a freelancer after seven years with the station. 

As a freelancer, Kim has hosted various popular variety shows ranging from singing competitions Mnet's Superstar K and MBC's King of Mask Singer to the cooking show Please Take Care of My Refrigerator. He has also returned to the sports broadcasting scene as a guest broadcaster for the 2014 Winter Olympics and 2016 Summer Olympics. In 2012 he notably returned to MBC to cover the London Olympics at the last minute due to the absence of experienced reporters from the ongoing reporters' union strikes, which earned him both praise and condemnation from viewers and fellow broadcasters alike.

On November 15, 2021, Kim founded the Matched Project (MCP) agency with Kim Young-man, Ahn Jung-hwan, and Jung Hyung-don.

Personal life
Kim married his university sweetheart in 2002 after a nine-year courtship. The couple have three children, sons Min-guk and Min-yul and daughter Min-joo. Min-guk and Min-yul were cast members on Dad! Where Are We Going? with their father.

Filmography

Films

Television shows

Hosting

Web shows

Awards and nominations

References

External links
 

1972 births
Living people
People from Seoul
South Korean television presenters
South Korean radio presenters
South Korean announcers
People from Cheongju
Chung-Ang University alumni